Sarcoplasmic/endoplasmic reticulum calcium ATPase 1 (SERCA1) is an enzyme that in humans is encoded by the ATP2A1 gene.

Function 

This gene encodes one of the SERCA Ca2+-ATPases, which are intracellular pumps located in the sarcoplasmic or endoplasmic reticula of muscle cells. This enzyme catalyzes the hydrolysis of ATP coupled with the translocation of calcium from the cytosol to the sarcoplasmic reticulum lumen, and is involved in muscular excitation and contraction.

Clinical significance 

Mutations in this gene cause some autosomal recessive forms of Brody disease, characterized by increasing impairment of muscular relaxation during exercise. Alternative splicing results in two transcript variants encoding different isoforms.
Alternative splicing of ATP2A1 is also implicated in myotonic dystrophy type 1.

ATP2A1 SERCA pumps were very strongly down regulated in amyotrophic lateral sclerosis.

Interactions 

ATP2A1 has been shown to interact with:
 SLN, and
 PLN.

References

External links

Further reading